Secret Trial Five is a Canadian five-piece political punk rock band formed in 2006 in Vancouver.

Origins
Sena Hussain formed Secret Trial Five with four friends following 9/11, when she became interested in making music with political messages. Secret Trial Five takes its name from a group of Muslims suspected of terrorism currently held without charge in Canada.

History
In fall 2007, Secret Trial Five toured the United States with Vote Hezbollah, The Kominas, Al-Thawra, and Diacritical on the Taqwatour. Early in September, Secret Trial Five were prevented from finishing their set at a Chicago show hosted by the Islamic Society of North America; some news agencies have reported that it was because the ISNA did not approve of women singing in public, while others have reported that the audience began quickly leaving during the band's first song.

Taqwacore controversy
Though initially identifying with taqwacore and participating in Omar Majeed's Taqwacore documentary, the band later rejected affiliation with the scene, announcing "We're not taqwacore!" on their website, due to their preference for political ideologies focusing on communities with which they more closely identify.

Music
Among the group's most referenced songs are "Hey Hey Guantanamo Bay" and "Emo-Hurram", the latter a pun on the first month of the Islamic calendar. Other notable songs include Middle Eastern Zombies, We're Not Taqwacore, and Colonizer, a parody of Britney Spears' Womanizer. The band has vocalized their support for the Boycott, Divestment and Sanctions movement and has been censored on numerous occasions. The group names taqwacore band The Kominas as one of its chief influences. Hussain, the lead singer, is openly gay.

Members
 Sena Hussain – Vocals
 Nat Ess – Guitar
 Sidra Mahmood – Guitar
 Gabi Rodriguez – Bass
 Karim Elawar – Drums

References

External links
Secret Trial Five at MySpace (defunct page)
Secret Trial Five at Facebook (last updated 2016)
Secret Trial Five at Reverbnation (one song available)
Sena Hussain materials in the South Asian American Digital Archive (SAADA)

All-female punk bands
Musical groups established in 2006
Musical groups from Vancouver
Canadian punk rock groups
Taqwacore
2006 establishments in British Columbia